Ivan Tsvetkov (born 13 September 1951) is a former Bulgarian cyclist. He competed in the individual and team pursuit events at the 1972 Summer Olympics.

References

External links
 

1951 births
Living people
Bulgarian male cyclists
Olympic cyclists of Bulgaria
Cyclists at the 1972 Summer Olympics
Place of birth missing (living people)